The  was a marathon race held in Otsu, Shiga, Japan. It was one of the prominent marathons in Japan. It was a male only competition and had IAAF Gold Label status. It was first held in 1946 and, having taken place every year since then, it was Japan's oldest annual marathon race. The early editions of the race were held in Osaka until a switch to Tokyo occurred for the 1963–64 marathons, and all subsequent races thereafter were held in Shiga Prefecture, starting in Ōtsu fronting Lake Biwa, where the race received its name. It was sponsored by Mainichi and was known simply as the Mainichi Marathon for a period. The final race was held in 2021.

The race began and ended at the Ojiyama Stadium. The Lake Biwa Marathon was selected as the Japanese national marathon championships on dozens of occasions, starting in 1960. The 2021 race was also noteworthy for having 29 runners finish in under 2:09:00 and 42 runners finish under 2:10:00.

The race was merged into the Osaka Marathon by the JAAF.  The elite men's race at the Osaka Marathon for 2022 was designated by officials as the 77th Annual Lake Biwa Marathon, while the other races were billed as the Osaka Marathon.

Winners 
Key:

Statistics

Winners by country

Multiple winners

Qualifications
The runners needed to meet both of the following requirements, or have a special recommendation from the JAAF, to enter the competition.
1, The runner must be at least 19 years old on the day of competition.
2, The runner should have achieved one of the following time within two years from the date of the competition.
(1)Marathon: 2 hours 30 minutes or less
(2)Half Marathon: 1 hour 10 minutes or less
(3)30km: 1 hour 40 minutes or less
(4)20km: 1 hour 5 minutes or less
(5)10000m: 31 minutes or less

References

External links 
 
Marathoninfo - Lake Biwa Marathon

Marathons in Japan
Recurring sporting events established in 1946
Sport in Shiga Prefecture
Men's marathons